What They Want may refer to:

 "What They Want" (Schoolboy Q song), a 2014 song by Schoolboy Q.
 "What They Want" (Russ song), a 2016 song by Russ.